Sir Thomas Sclater, 1st Baronet (9 July 1615 – 10 December 1684) was an English  academic, landowner and politician who sat in the House of Commons in 1659. 

Sclater was the son of William Sclater of Halifax Yorkshire and was baptised at Halifax on the day of his birth. He was a Fellow of Trinity College, Cambridge University. He was incorporated BA at Oxford University from 1635 to 1636 and was awarded MA in 1639. He was created Doctor of Medicine in 1649 and was incorporated at Cambridge University in that year. In 1659, he was elected Member of Parliament for Cambridge University in the Third Protectorate Parliament. Following the Restoration, he was created baronet of Cambridge on 25 July 1660. He purchased Catley Park and other estates in Cambridgeshire and was Sheriff of Cambridgeshire from 1683 to 1684.
 
Sclater later died at the age of 69 when the baronetcy became extinct.

Sclater married on 25 February 1653 Susan Comber, widow of Thomas Comber, Master of Trinity College a daughter of Freston of Norwich.

References

1615 births
1684 deaths
Members of the pre-1707 Parliament of England for the University of Cambridge
English landowners
Alumni of the University of Oxford
Baronets in the Baronetage of England
High Sheriffs of Cambridgeshire
English MPs 1659